Changchun Dafangshen Airport, or Dafangshen Air Base, is a military air base in Changchun, the capital of Jilin Province in Northeast China. Originally constructed in 1941 by the Empire of Japan for the capital of its puppet state Manchukuo, Dafangshen Airport saw fierce fighting and was severely damaged during the siege of Changchun in the Chinese Civil War. It served as Changchun's commercial international airport from October 1960 until August 2005, when all civil flights were transferred to the new Changchun Longjia International Airport.

Location and facilities 
After it became Changchun's main public airport in the People's Republic of China era, it was expanded multiple times, with a domestic terminal, an international terminal, and a  dedicated railway among the later additions.

History

Manchukuo and Republic of China
Dafangshen Airport was built by the Empire of Japan in 1941 to serve Changchun (Hsinking), then capital of the Japanese puppet state Manchukuo. It replaced the older and smaller Kuanchengzi Airport (宽城子机场).

Near the end of World War II, a Soviet airborne force landed at Dafangshen Airport on 20 August 1945 and captured Changchun from the Japanese army. When the Soviet forces left Changchun on 14 April 1946, the communist Northeast People's Liberation Army took over the city and the airport. Soon afterwards Chiang Kai-shek's Kuomintang army drove out the communists on 23 May 1946.

During the Liaoshen Campaign of the Chinese Civil War, the Northeast People's Liberation Army besieged Changchun. Xiao Jinguang captured Dafangshen and damaged its runway in May 1948 to prevent the Kuomintang from using the airport to supply Zheng Dongguo's defensive forces inside the city. On 16 October, the Kuomintang army launched a fierce attack in an attempt to recapture the airport, but were repelled by Xiao's forces. Most buildings and facilities of the airport were destroyed in the fighting.

People's Republic of China
After the Communists won the civil war and establishment of the People's Republic of China in 1949, Dafangshen Airport was used for pilot training by the Second Aviation Academy of the People's Liberation Army Air Force. It was later expanded for civil aviation and replaced Datun Airport as Changchun's public airport in October 1960. A  domestic terminal and a  international terminal were constructed. It served mainly domestic destinations as well as Hong Kong and Seoul.

As air travel became increasingly common since the reform and opening era, Dafangshen could not longer accommodate the rapid growth of air traffic, and the new Changchun Longjia International Airport was constructed to replace it as Changchun's public airport. Longjia Airport was opened on 27 August 2005, and Dafangshen reverted to sole military use.

Former airlines and destinations 
Shortly after the economic reform and opening up, the air traffic rose dramatically, and many airlines (whether domestic or international) had once operated in Changchun in its heyday. The airlines and destinations are:

Gallery

References 

Airports in Jilin
Defunct airports in China
Transport in Changchun
Manchukuo
Airports established in 1941
Airports established in 1960
1941 establishments in China
1960 establishments in China
2005 disestablishments in China
Chinese Air Force bases
Chinese Civil War